Firmo Roberti (born 4 February 1943) is an Argentine former sport shooter who competed in the 1972 Summer Olympics, in the 1976 Summer Olympics, in the 1984 Summer Olympics, in the 1988 Summer Olympics, and in the 1992 Summer Olympics.

See also
 List of athletes with the most appearances at Olympic Games

References

1943 births
Living people
Argentine male sport shooters
Skeet shooters
Olympic shooters of Argentina
Shooters at the 1972 Summer Olympics
Shooters at the 1976 Summer Olympics
Shooters at the 1984 Summer Olympics
Shooters at the 1988 Summer Olympics
Shooters at the 1992 Summer Olympics
Pan American Games medalists in shooting
Pan American Games bronze medalists for Argentina
Shooters at the 1979 Pan American Games
Shooters at the 1991 Pan American Games